Bhawal Charna is a village in Nagaur district, India. As of the 2011 Census of India, its population is 721.

References 

Villages in Nagaur district